Summer A. Smith was an American photographer who worked in the 1850s and 1860s and was an early creator of daguerrotypes.

Career 

Smith was one of eighteen professional women photographers who worked in Pennsylvania prior to 1870. 

She was active in the 1850s and 1860s, including a stint in Philadelphia and Montrose, Iowa. While in Philadelphia, she boarded at one of the several inns known as the Black Horse Tavern and operated a daguerreotypist studio nearby.

Two of her prints are included in the collection of the Museum of Fine Arts Houston.

Notable work 

 Blacksmith Forging a Horseshoe, 1859-1860

References

19th-century American photographers
Photographers from Pennsylvania
Year of birth missing
Year of death missing
19th-century American women photographers